In Greek mythology, Autolaus (Ancient Greek:  Αὐτόλαος) was the illegitimate son of King Arcas of Arcadia. He found and brought up the infant god Asclepius when the infant was exposed in Thelpusa.

Notes

References 

 Pausanias, Description of Greece with an English Translation by W.H.S. Jones, Litt.D., and H.A. Ormerod, M.A., in 4 Volumes. Cambridge, MA, Harvard University Press; London, William Heinemann Ltd. 1918. . Online version at the Perseus Digital Library
 Pausanias, Graeciae Descriptio. 3 vols. Leipzig, Teubner. 1903.  Greek text available at the Perseus Digital Library.

Characters in Greek mythology
Arcadian mythology